Cordyle or Kordyle, also called Portus Chordyle, was a town of ancient Pontus, on the Black Sea coast, 40 or 45 stadia east of Hieron Oros or Yoros. The name occurs in the Tabula Peutingeriana in the form Cordile. There appears to be some confusion in Ptolemy about this place.

Its site is located near Akcakale in Trabzon Province at Turkey.

References

Populated places in ancient Pontus
Former populated places in Turkey
History of Trabzon Province
Ancient Greek archaeological sites in Turkey